Thomas McLelland Browne (April 19, 1829 – July 17, 1891) was an American attorney and politician who served as a U.S. representative for Indiana's 5th and 6th congressional district.

Early life and education 
Born in New Paris, Ohio, Browne moved to Indiana in January 1844. He attended the common schools. He moved to Winchester, Indiana, in 1848.

Career 
He studied law and was admitted to the bar in 1849 and commenced practice in Winchester. Browne was elected prosecuting attorney for the thirteenth judicial circuit in 1855 and was reelected in 1857 and 1859. He was named secretary of the Indiana Senate in 1861 and served as a member in 1863.

Browne assisted in organizing the 7th Indiana Cavalry Regiment of the Union Army, and went to the field with that regiment as captain of Company B on August 28, 1863. He was commissioned lieutenant colonel on October 1, 1863. He was promoted to colonel on October 10, 1865, and subsequently brevetted a brigadier general to date from March 13, 1865. After the war, he mustered out of the Army on February 18, 1866.

He was appointed United States attorney for the District of Indiana in April 1869 and served until his resignation August 1, 1872. In 1872 he ran against Benjamin Harrison for the Republican nomination for governor of Indiana. He won the nomination but was defeated in the general election by the Democratic candidate, Thomas A. Hendricks. He served as a delegate to the 1876 Republican National Convention.

Browne was elected as a Republican to the House of Representatives, where he served from March 4, 1877, to March 3, 1891. He served as chairman of the Committee on Invalid Pensions (Forty-seventh Congress), Committee on Revision of the Laws (Fifty-first Congress). He was not a candidate for renomination in 1890.

Death 
Browne died in Winchester, Indiana, on July 17, 1891. He was interred in Fountain Park Cemetery.

References

People from Winchester, Indiana
People from New Paris, Ohio
Republican Party Indiana state senators
United States Attorneys for the District of Indiana
American Disciples of Christ
People of Indiana in the American Civil War
1829 births
1891 deaths
Union Army generals
19th-century American politicians
Republican Party members of the United States House of Representatives from Indiana